Jennifer Capriati was the defending champion, but did not compete this year.

Arantxa Sánchez Vicario won the title by defeating Monica Seles 6–4, 3–6, 6–4 in the final.

Seeds
The first eight seeds received a bye to the second round.

Draw

Finals

Top half

Section 1

Section 2

Bottom half

Section 3

Section 4

References

External links
 ITF results archive
 WTA results archive

1992 WTA Tour
1992 in Canadian tennis